The Fabric of Saint Peter is an institution of the Roman Catholic Church responsible for the conservation and maintenance of St. Peter's Basilica and exercising vigilance over its sacred character and the organization of visitors. While it is not part of the Roman Curia, the 1988 apostolic constitution Pastor bonus recognized it as "closely associated with the Holy See", and the apostolic constitution restructuring the Curia in 2022, Praedicate evangelium, did so as well. The Fabric has existed under various names and varying responsibilities since 1523, when Pope Clement VII established a commission to build and administer the Basilica.

On 29 June 2020, Pope Francis appointed Archbishop Mario Giordana, a veteran papal diplomat, to lead a commission to reform the Fabric's administration. As Extraordinary Commissioner he is to "modernize and reorganize ... administrative and technical offices, improve transparency, and update the statutes" of the Fabric.

In January 2023, the death of Monsignor Michele Basso, a canon of the basilica, attracted media attention to the art collection he had bequeathed to the Fabric of Saint Peter. The collection remained in storage beneath the dome of the basilica. The press questioned the provenance and value of the artworks, of which little is known.

Presidents
The archpriest of the Basilica is customarily the president of the Fabric.

Paolo Marella (14 August 1961 - 8 February 1983)
Aurelio Sabattani (8 February 1983 - 1 July 1991)
Virgilio Noè (1 July 1991 - 24 April 2002)
Francesco Marchisano (24 April 2002 - 5 February 2005)
Angelo Comastri (5 February 2005 - 20 February 2021)
Mauro Gambetti, O.F.M. Conv. (20 February 2021 – present)

Architects
Andrea Busiri Vici (1818 - 1911), papal architect

References

Additional sources

Catholic Church organizations
Christian organizations established in 1908